Vincent Cali (born 22 April 1970) is a French former road cyclist, who competed as a professional from 1997 to 2003. He most notably won the 1998 Tour du Limousin and the 1996 Ronde de l'Isard.

Major results

1996
 1st  Overall Ronde de l'Isard
 1st Grand Prix Cristal Energie
 2nd Overall Mi-Août en Bretagne
1998
 1st  Overall Tour du Limousin
1st Stage 3
 3rd Overall Tour de l'Ain
1999
 2nd Boucles de l'Aulne
 3rd Overall Tour Trans Canada
2000
 3rd Overall Tour de la Region Wallonne
 7th Overall Tour de Beauce
2001
 2nd Druivenkoers-Overijse
 4th Tour du Finistère
 7th GP Ouest–France
2003
 9th Polynormande

Grand Tour general classification results timeline

References

External links

1970 births
Living people
French male cyclists
Sportspeople from Saint-Étienne
Cyclists from Auvergne-Rhône-Alpes